Oploo, Sint Anthonis en Ledeacker was a municipality in the Dutch province of North Brabant. It was created in 1821, in a merger of Oploo and Sint Anthonis en Ledeacker. The municipality existed until 1994, when it became part of a larger municipality called St. Anthonis, changed into Sint Anthonis after a short time.

Since 2022 Sint Anthonis has been part of the new municipality of Land van Cuijk

References

Municipalities of the Netherlands disestablished in 1994
Former municipalities of North Brabant
Geography of Land van Cuijk